The 2010–11 Biathlon World Cup - World Cup 9 was held in Holmenkollen, Oslo, Norway, from 17 March until 20 March 2011.

Schedule of events 
The time schedule of the event stands below

Medal winners

Men

Women

Achievements
 Best performance for all time

 , 1st place in Sprint
 , 4th place in Sprint
 , 5th place in Sprint and Pursuit
 , 14th place in Sprint, 12th place in Pursuit and 10th place in Mass Start
 , 15th place in Sprint
 , 40th place in Sprint and 24th in Pursuit
 , 59th place in Sprint and 55th place in Pursuit
 , 41st place in Pursuit
 , 9th place in Sprint
 , 40th place in Sprint
 , 5th place in Pursuit
 , 25th place in Pursuit
 , 27th place in Pursuit
 , 45th place in Pursuit
 , 46th place in Pursuit

 First World Cup race

 , 67th place in Sprint
 , 10th place in Sprint
 , 32nd place in Sprint
 , 50th place in Sprint
 , 55th place in Sprint

References 

2010–11 Biathlon World Cup
Biathlon World Cup - World Cup 9
March 2011 sports events in Europe
International sports competitions in Oslo
2010s in Oslo
Biathlon competitions in Norway